Graeme Arthur Pinfold (20 April 1936 – 17 December 1986) was an Australian rules footballer who played with Melbourne in the Victorian Football League (VFL).

Notes

External links 

1936 births
1986 deaths
Australian rules footballers from New South Wales
Melbourne Football Club players
Preston Football Club (VFA) players